The men's pole vault event at the 2019 European Athletics U23 Championships was held in Gävle, Sweden, at Gavlehof Stadium Park on 11 and 13 July.

Medalists

Results

Qualification
Qualification rule: 5.45 (Q) or the 12 best results (q) qualified for the final.

Final

References

Pole
Pole vault at the European Athletics U23 Championships